Division No. 6, Subd. A is an unorganized subdivision in north-central Newfoundland, Newfoundland and Labrador, Canada. It is in Division No. 6. It surrounds the towns of Buchans and Millertown.

According to the 2016 Statistics Canada Census:
Population: 128
% Change (2011-2016): 36.2
Dwellings: 351
Area (km2): 5,335.76
Density (persons per km2): 0.0

Newfoundland and Labrador subdivisions